Kurtuluş is a village in Silifke district of Mersin Province, Turkey. At  it is situated in delta of Göksu River. The population of Kurtuluş is 1,275  as of 2011.

References

Villages in Silifke District